Bernardo Riccio (born 21 March 1985) is an Italian former professional road cyclist.

Major results
2005
 6th Coppa Citta di Asti
2008
 1st Stage 3 Clásica Internacional de Alcobendas
 8th GP Costa Degli Etruschi
2011
 1st Stages 5 & 7 Tour of South Africa
 3rd GP Nobili Rubinetterie

References

1985 births
Living people
Italian male cyclists
People from Caserta
Cyclists from Campania
Sportspeople from the Province of Caserta